Richard Smart (by 1507 – 28 August 1560) was an English burgess of Ipswich, Suffolk, and landed gentleman who served as a member of the House of Commons of England.

Smart held the manors of Great and Little Stanbridge, holding them both of Thomas Shaa by fealty and a small annual rent. He was one of the two Members of Parliament for Ipswich in 1545 and again in 1555.

He died on 28 August 1560.

References

1560 deaths
Members of the Parliament of England (pre-1707) for Ipswich
English MPs 1545–1547
English MPs 1555
Year of birth uncertain